The American Association of Engineering Societies (AAES) is an umbrella organization of engineering societies in the US, founded by a group of 43 societies in 1979. After several disputes, and a change in focus in the mid-1980s from speaking for the societies to coordinating between the societies, its membership was reduced to 22 societies by 1993, and 17 societies . In 2019, AAES announced that the organization was dissolving as of early 2020

References

External links

American engineering organizations
Engineering societies based in the United States
Organizations established in 1979